PCQ may refer to:

 Parti communiste du Québec, the Quebec section of the Communist Party of Canada
 Parti conservateur du Québec
 PIMCO California Municipal Income Fund (NYSE:PCQ), a company listed on the New York Stock Exchange
 Psychological Capital Questionnaire, a tool used for measuring psychological outcomes

See also
 PCQuest (magazine), an Indian technology magazine